The Golden Globe (Portugal) for Best Sportsman is awarded annually at the Golden Globes (Portugal) to the best Portuguese male athletes of the previous year.

Winners

References

Awards established in 1996
Sportsmanship trophies and awards
Golden Globes (Portugal)